The Canadian Association of Fringe Festivals (CAFF) is an international body that promotes and safeguards the ideals and principles of fringe theatre in North America.

History
The 1982 Edmonton International Fringe Festival, modelled after the Edinburgh Festival Fringe, was the first successful instance of Fringe theatre in North America.  Based on its success, an informal network of other Canadian and American Fringe festivals arose.  Concerned about the growth of festivals that might claim the "Fringe" title without being aligned with the original spirit of Fringe Theatre, festival directors from this network founded the Canadian Association of Fringe Festivals in 1990.  The organization was incorporated as a non-profit in 1994.  In 1998, CAFF successfully trademarked the terms "Fringe" and "Fringe Festival" in Canada to ensure that any theatre festival wishing to refer to itself as a "Fringe" would agree to abide by both CAFF's guiding principles and the CAFF mandate.

Principles and Mandate
At the time of its formation, CAFF defined four minimum guiding principles for Fringe Festivals:

 Participants will be selected on a non-juried basis, through a first-come, first served process, a lottery, or other method approved by the Association
 In order to ensure Criteria One (above), the audiences must have the option to pay a ticket price, 100% of which goes directly to the artists.
 Fringe Festival producers have no control over the artistic content of each performance. The artistic freedom of the participants is unrestrained.
 Festivals must provide an easily accessible opportunity for all audiences and all artists to participate in Fringe Festivals.

The mandate of CAFF is as follows:

 To safeguard the integrity of Fringe Festivals as outlined in the four minimum criteria
 To recognize that the health of all member Festivals is important to the Circuit and therefore the artists' health as a whole
 To encourage communication and cooperation between member Festivals thereby fostering the continuity of our guiding principles

List of member festivals
As of January 2017, CAFF consisted of 33 festivals from across North America.

 Storefront Fringe Festival
 Guelph Fringe
 Lethbridge Fringe
 FRIGID New York
 Chicago Fringe Festival
 Orlando International Fringe Theater Festival
 London Fringe Theatre Festival (Ontario)
 Great Salt Lake Fringe
 St-Ambroise Montreal Fringe Festival
 Alberni Valley Fringe Festival
 Ottawa Fringe Festival
 PortFringe
 Regina International Fringe Festival
 Toronto Fringe Festival
 San Diego International Fringe Festival
 Winnipeg Fringe Theatre Festival
 Windsor Fringe Festival
 ON THE EDGE fringe festival
 Fringe North
 Hamilton Fringe Festival
 Saskatoon Fringe Theatre Festival
 Calgary Fringe Festival
 Fundy Fringe Festival
 Edmonton International Fringe Festival
 Nanaimo Fringe Festival
 Indianapolis Theatre Fringe Festival
 Island Fringe Festival
 Victoria Fringe Theatre Festival
 Atlantic Fringe Festival
 San Francisco Fringe Festival
 Vancouver Fringe Festival
 Boulder International Fringe Festival
 Elgin Fringe
 Zootown Fringe

Touring Lottery
While individual festivals are mostly programmed independently, CAFF reserves spots in each member festival's lineup for the winners of its annual touring lottery.  Winning artists are permitted to enter any of the festivals instead of going through each individual festival's lottery process.

Activities
In 2012, CAFF engaged the Canadian federal government to request a parity negotiation in the treatment of American performers entering Canada and Canadian performers entering the United States.

References

External links
 Official website

 
Theatrical organizations in Canada
Festival organizations in North America